Phanerostylis is a genus of Mexican plants in the tribe Eupatorieae within the family Asteraceae.

 Species
 Phanerostylis coahuilensis (A.Gray) R.M.King & H.Rob. - Chihuahua, Coahuila, Tamaulipas, Nuevo León, San Luis Potosí, Zacatecas
 Phanerostylis glutinosa (Brandegee) R.M.King & H.Rob. - Oaxaca, Puebla
 Phanerostylis hintoniorum (B.L.Turner) R.M.King & H.Rob. - Coahuila, Nuevo León
 Phanerostylis nesomii (B.L.Turner) R.M.King & H.Rob.  - Coahuila, Nuevo León, 	Tamaulipas
 Phanerostylis pedunculosa (DC.) R.M.King & H.Rob. - Guanajuato, Aguascalientes, Durango, Hidalgo, Jalisco, Michoacán, San Luis Potosí, Zacatecas

References

Endemic flora of Mexico
Asteraceae genera
Eupatorieae